AVCon, abbreviated from Adelaide's Anime and Video Games Festival, is an Australian anime and video games festival held in Adelaide, South Australia and organised by the registered charity Team AVCon Inc. The festival is traditionally held annually in July, spanning three days, first at the University of Adelaide, then at the Adelaide Convention Centre until 2019. The festival was not held between 2020 and 2022 because of the COVID-19 Pandemic. Team AVCon issued a statement on their social media and official website stating that the AVCon festival will not be going ahead in 2022 as a large event. Instead, Team AVCon will run mini-events and focus on reconnecting with the regional and metropolitan communities. Team AVCon announced the Festival dates and venue for AVCon 2023 via there social media and website, with the Festival planned for July 21-23rd 2023 at the Adelaide Convention Centre.

Events and Programming 
AVCon features many events and activities during the festival for attendees to take part in, such as community and industry-led panels and workshops, tabletop gaming, competitions, video game and tabletop tournaments, and free play gaming.

AVCon has held a large variety of focus panels, workshops, and events run by fans. Top attractions include the AVCon masquerade cosplay contest, quiz night and auction. AVCon has hosted many industry guests, including notable voice actors who often hold panels. Numerous film and video rooms showed anime screenings that run all day and into the evening.

Much like other festivals, AVCon also features a large scale exhibit hall where attendees can purchase various products from a wide range of exhibitors. The exhibitor hall also features an artist alley where attendees can purchase fan-created artwork and merchandise.

Festival History

History 
AVCon began as a joint convention supported by volunteers from the University of South Australia's Adelaide Japanese Animation Society (AJAS) and the Adelaide University Video Gamers Association (AUVGA, now known as EVAC). After four successful annual conventions, Team AVCon Inc was established as an independent entity to run and sustain the annual convention.

In 2008, the event outgrew its convention status due to continuing growth in attendee numbers. It became a festival, and the festival was relocated to the Adelaide Convention Centre. This venue change resulted in double the previous year's ticket sales, with an attendance of just over 4,000 people. In 2010, the festival was again held at the Adelaide Convention Centre with 8,000 attendees, and the numbers increased once more to over 14,000 in 2011.

Due to the COVID-19 pandemic in Australia, the 2020 AVCon festival was cancelled. The 2021 AVCon festival was scheduled to be held at the Morphettville Racecourse from 9–11 July. An official statement was released on the 30th of June 2021 stating the festival would be postponed due to lockdown in South Australia. On the 24th of July, Team AVCon announced that the 2021 festival had been cancelled. The cancellation was due to restrictions on gatherings likely persisting even after lockdown ends and the venue already being booked through the remainder of the year for other events. Team AVCon stated that "the possibility that we can run a large-scale event for thousands of people at any time in the near future has all but disappeared. Even when things are under control, it is likely tough restrictions will remain that will make large-scale gatherings for months to come next to impossible."

On the 16th of March 2022, an official statement was released on Team AVCon's social media and website announcing that AVCon: Adelaide's Anime and Video Games Festival will not be going ahead in 2022 as a large event. This decision was due to the risk of cancellation due to fluctuating COVID restrictions leading to a negative financial impact on Team AVCon's future and the safety of staff, attendees, volunteers and guests.

Mini Events 
In 2022, Team AVCon announced that 2022 would see smaller events and reconnecting with the community in anticipation of the return of the festival in 2023. Team AVCon ran an artist alley and a Super Smash Bros. Ultimate tournament during the 2022 Adelaide Fringe, and the PlayStation 4 gaming booth during the 2022 Oz Comic Con event at the Adelaide Showground. An adults-only event called "AVCon After Dark" is set to be held on July 8.

Festival Locations

Organisational Structure 
Team AVCon Incorporated, the parent organisation which produce AVCon, is a registered charity which follows an Incorporated Association structure under the Associations Incorporation Act 1985. Each year, a new Elect is voted in by the membership and the Committee are appointed by the Elect from previous Elect, Committee, new and existing members.

The purposes for which the incorporated Association is established for are: 

(i) to organise and run:

 anime and video game-related festivals, 
 anime and video game-related events, and 
 other events and/or festivals.

(ii) to promote community interest in Japanese culture and society,

(iii) to encourage the appreciation of anime and other related art forms, which include (but are not limited to) manga, video games and amateur works of written or artistic pursuit.

References

External links 
 Official website

Gaming conventions
Video game trade shows
Conventions in Australia
2002 establishments in Australia
Anime conventions in Australia
Festivals in Adelaide
Annual events in Australia
Multigenre conventions